Joseph Wilfrid Lionel Gerard Bouvrette (June 10, 1914 — February 8, 2000) was a Canadian ice hockey goaltender.

Bouvrette played one game in the National Hockey League for the New York Rangers during the 1942–43 season on March 18, 1943. His rights were owned by the Montreal Canadiens who agreed to loan Bouvrette to the Rangers to replace the injured Jimmy Franks. He had a more successful career with the Quebec Aces of the Quebec Senior Hockey League, leading the league twice in shutouts. He was also the recipient of the Vimy Memorial Trophy, awarded to the league's Most Valuable Player.

Career statistics

Regular season and playoffs

See also
List of players who played only one game in the NHL

External links

1914 births
2000 deaths
Canadian expatriate ice hockey players in the United States
Canadian ice hockey goaltenders
Franco-Ontarian people
Ice hockey people from Ontario
New York Rangers players
People from Hawkesbury, Ontario
Quebec Aces (QSHL) players